The God Rhythm is the fifth studio album of Wisdom In Chains. It is their first album under their new record label "Fast break! records". It was released on June 30, 2015.

Track list 
 People Die 
 When We Were Young 
 Resonate 
 How Far Will You Go 
 Songs To My Killer 
 Mathematics 
 Fatherless 
 Best Of Me 
 The God Rhythm 
 Violent Americans 
 Joey Ramone 
 Skinhead Gang 
 Outro

References 

2015 albums
Wisdom in Chains albums